Sailors Don't Care is a 1928 British silent comedy film directed by W. P. Kellino and starring Estelle Brody, John Stuart and Alf Goddard. It is based on a novel by "Seamark" (Austin J. Small).

Cast
 Estelle Brody – Jenny Melrose
 John Stuart – Slinger Woods
 Alf Goddard – Nobby Clark
 Humberston Wright – Sir William Graham
 Gladys Hamer – Rose Bishop
 Mary Brough – Cook
 George Thirlwell – Lieutenant Graham
 Wallace Bosco – Fink
 Vivian Baron – Commander Forrester
 Shayle Gardner – Messenger

References

Bibliography
 Low, Rachel. The History of British Film: Volume IV, 1918–1929. Routledge, 1997.

External links

1928 films
1928 comedy films
British comedy films
British silent feature films
1920s English-language films
Films directed by W. P. Kellino
Seafaring films
Films based on British novels
Films shot at Lime Grove Studios
British black-and-white films
1920s British films
Silent comedy films
Silent adventure films